Pyrosulphite  may refer to:
 Potassium pyrosulphite
 Sodium pyrosulphite